Sunset Junction is an informal name for a portion of the Silver Lake district of  Los Angeles, California. It was home to the Sunset Junction Street Fair from 1980 through 2010. It is in the southwestern part of the district along Sunset Boulevard.

The name refers to the street junction of Sunset Boulevard and Santa Monica Boulevard, two of the largest streets in Los Angeles, both of which travel from Sunset Junction to the Pacific Ocean. For most of their distance, the streets run parallel, but join here where they intersect Sanborn Avenue and where Santa Monica Blvd ends.

History
Originally the junction was formed by the branching of two interurban railway lines and was known as Sanborn or Hollywood Junction. In 1895, the Pasadena and Pacific Railway Company built an interurban rail line from downtown Los Angeles to Santa Monica, whose route ran along Sunset Boulevard as far as Sanborn Avenue, where it turned west along the present alignment of Santa Monica Boulevard. In 1905, the Los Angeles Pacific Railway, successor to the Pasadena and Pacific, built a new branch northwest along Sunset Boulevard from Sanborn Avenue as a shortcut to its existing line on Hollywood Boulevard, forming the junction that is still reflected in the existing street configuration.  The Los Angeles Pacific Company was one of the eight rail companies merged in 1911 to form the Pacific Electric Railway. Rail service ceased on the two lines in 1954 and 1953, respectively.

Sunset  Junction is the site of one of the first actions in the nation against police activity in gay bars, the Black Cat Tavern protest, which began on February 11, 1967, almost two and a half years before the more famous protest at the Stonewall Inn in New York’s Greenwich Village. The event is named for the Black Cat Tavern, formerly at 3909 Sunset Blvd between Sanborn and Hyperion Avenues, a location that had been a gay bar periodically since the 1940s. Organized in response to a police raid on the Black Cat on New Year’s Eve 1966, in which several people were hurt, the protest was planned  to coincide with similar actions at African-American, Latino and “hippie” establishments  around the city, which were also regularly patrolled.  Of these, the protest at the Black Cat was most successful, with over 200 people marching without any violent confrontation.  The Black Cat protest continued for several days but did not attract the media attention that the protests at the Stonewall Inn later did.

For many years Silver Lake housed a small, quiet gay and lesbian population, but in the 1970s a combination of affordable housing, a bohemian ambiance and promotion by gay real estate agents caused the gay and lesbian population to swell to more than 20% of the neighborhood total.

In 1979, an early literary gay and lesbian bookstores, A Different Light, was founded at 4014 Santa Monica Boulevard. The store functioned as a focal point for the community and was the site of readings by noted authors, including  Christopher Isherwood, Allen Ginsberg, William Burroughs and Larry Kramer. Subsequently, additional branches were opened in West Hollywood (1990), San Francisco, and Greenwich Village in Manhattan.  The original store closed in 1992, as have the branches in Greenwich Village, West Hollywood, and San Francisco.

Tensions in the 1970s between the growing gay and lesbian population and working-class Latino families in the Silver Lake neighborhood led the integrated lesbian and gay Sunset Junction Neighborhood Alliance to organize the first Sunset Junction Street Fair in 1980.

References

External links

Curbed LA: Sunset Junction posts

Silver Lake, Los Angeles
Neighborhoods in Los Angeles
Gay villages in California
Central Los Angeles
Northwest Los Angeles
Sunset Boulevard (Los Angeles)
Pacific Electric junctions